Traveller Supplement 8: Library Data (A-M) is a 1981 tabletop role-playing game supplement written by Frank Chadwick, John Harshman, Marc W. Miller, and Loren K. Wiseman for Traveller published by Game Designers' Workshop. Library Data (A-M) covers most of the important library entries from the published Traveller adventures. Thirteen Traveller supplements were published. A single collected volume was published by Far Future Enterprises in 2000.

Reception
William A. Barton reviewed Library Data (A-M) in The Space Gamer No. 46. Barton commented that "I have no real complaints at all with Library Data (A-M) – except that I wish it could have been possible to include the rest of the alphabet without dropping any of the present entries.  I think you'll find it the best source of information on the Traveller universe anywhere."

Bob McWilliams reviewed Library Data (A-M) for White Dwarf #28, giving it an overall rating of 9 out of 10 for the novice (and 7 for the expert), and stated that "this is an important reference work for all Traveller players and referees who use the official Traveller campaign as a background for their adventures."

See also
 Traveller Supplement 11: Library Data (N-Z)
 Classic Traveller Supplements

References

Role-playing game supplements introduced in 1981
Traveller (role-playing game) supplements